Carrie Snyder is a Canadian writer. Her 2012 short story collection The Juliet Stories was a nominee for the Governor General's Award for English fiction at the 2012 Governor General's Awards. She is also the author of the blog, Obscure Canlit Mama.

In 2014 she published her debut novel Girl Runner. It was inspired by the 1928 Summer Olympics in which women were first allowed to compete in track and field. It was shortlisted for the Rogers Writers' Trust Fiction Prize.

Born in Hamilton, Ontario, she currently lives in Waterloo with her husband, four children and a dog. In 2019 and 2020, along with local art groups, she co-coordinated the X Page storytelling workshop for immigrant and refugee women.  She spent part of her childhood living in Nicaragua, which is reflected in The Juliet Stories.

Works
Hair Hat (2004)
The Juliet Stories (2012)
Girl Runner (2014)
The Candy Conspiracy (2015)
Jammie Day! (2017)
Francie's Got a Gun (2022)

References

Writers from Hamilton, Ontario
Writers from Waterloo, Ontario
Living people
Canadian women short story writers
21st-century Canadian women writers
21st-century Canadian short story writers
Year of birth missing (living people)
Mennonite writers
Canadian Mennonites